The Barrios Mágicos are twenty one areas in Mexico City highlighted by the government in order to attract tourism to them.  The program is sponsored by the city government and is patterned after the “Pueblos Mágicos” (Magical Towns) program of the Mexican federal government. However, one difference is that the city does not require the “barrios” to make improvements in their appearances to be accepted.

The first of the barrios were named in 2011 by city Secretary of Tourism Alejandro Rojas Díaz Durán. Each of the twenty one named neighborhoods received stylistic scrolls with the accreditation with acceptance by registration in the official newspaper called the Gaceta Oficial del DF. The first to receive its scroll was Santa María Magdalena Atlitic.

The twenty one neighborhoods include the historic center of Coyoacán, the Roma-Condesa zone, the historic center of Xochimilco, San Ángel, San Agustín de la Cuevas (historic center of Tlalpan), Santa María la Ribera, Zona Rosa, Garibaldi, Villa de Guadalupe, Mixcoac, Tacubaya, Santa María Magdalena Atlitic, historic center of Azcapotzalco, La Merced, Mixquic, historic center of Cuajimalpa, San Pedro Atocpan, Pueblo Culhuacán, Tacuba, Santa Julia and the historic center of Iztacalco. The city's Secretary of Tourism plans on having thirty such neighborhoods, with areas such as the Los Dinamos ecological reserve nominated.

The neighborhoods have been declared only on paper as neither the city nor the boroughs have the money to promote them. The program's legality has been questioned by the president of the ALDF Tourism Commission, Carlo Pizano as the designations were made without prior public publication.

See also
List of pre-columbian archaeological sites in Mexico City
List of colonial churches in Mexico City

References

Tourism in Mexico
Tourist attractions in Mexico City
.
Geography of Mexico City